The Yan Mountains, also known by their Chinese name Yanshan, are a major mountain range to the north of the North China Plain, principally in the province of Hebei.

The range rises between the Chaobai River on the west and the Shanhai Pass on the east. It consists mostly of limestone, granite, and basalt. Its altitude ranges from 400 to 1000 meters. The range contains many narrow passes, such as the Gubei Pass, the Xifeng Pass, and the Leng Pass. The eastern stretch of the Great Wall of China, including Badaling in northern Beijing, can be found in the Yan Mountains. The mountains are also an important traffic gateway between the north and south.

Notes

References

North China Plain
Mountain ranges of China
Mountains of Hebei
Mountains of Beijing